Leslie Gilliat (29 May 191713 July 2013) was a British film producer and production manager. He was the younger brother of director Sidney Gilliat, with whom he worked on a number of films for British Lion Films.

Selected filmography
 The Blue Lagoon (1949)
 Left Right and Centre (1959)
 Only Two Can Play (1962)
 The Amorous Prawn (1962)
 Two Left Feet (1963)
 Ring of Spies (1964)
 The Great St Trinian's Train Robbery (1966)
 The Virgin Soldiers (1969)
 The Buttercup Chain (1970)
 Endless Night (1972)

References

Bibliography
 Bruce Babington. Launder and Gilliat. Manchester University Press, 2002

External links

1917 births
2013 deaths
British film producers
People from Surrey